Events in the year 2022 in Lesotho.

Incumbents 

 King: Letsie III
 Prime Minister: Moeketsi Majoro

Events 
Ongoing — COVID-19 pandemic in Lesotho

7 October – 2022 Lesotho general election: Citizens in Lesotho head to the polls to elect the 120 members of the National Assembly.

10 October – The Revolution for Prosperity party wins the election by a small margin and falling short of controlling the National Assembly.

11 October – The Revolution for Prosperity party forms a majority coalition with the Alliance of Democrats and Movement for Economic Change, says RFP leader Sam Matekane.

Sports 

 18 June - 3 July: Lesotho at the 2022 Commonwealth Games
 15 July - 24 July: Lesotho at the 2022 World Athletics Championships
 28 July - 8 August: Lesotho at the 2022 Commonwealth Games

References 

 
2020s in Lesotho
Years of the 21st century in Lesotho
Lesotho
Lesotho